Pascal de Wilde (1 May 1965) is a former Belgian footballer who played as attacking midfielder. Born in Bruges, he is of Congolese descent.

Honours 
KV Mechelen

 Belgian First Division: 1988–89
 European Cup Winners Cup: 1987–88
 European Super Cup: 1988

References 

1965 births
Living people
Footballers from Bruges
Belgian footballers
Association football midfielders
Club Brugge KV players
K.V. Mechelen players
Valenciennes FC players
Hoogstraten VV players
K.R.C. Zuid-West-Vlaanderen players
Belgian expatriate footballers
Belgian expatriate sportspeople in France
Expatriate footballers in France
Belgian Pro League players